The Sappington Formation is a geologic formation in Montana. It preserves fossils dating back to the Carboniferous period.

See also

 List of fossiliferous stratigraphic units in Montana
 Paleontology in Montana

References
 

Carboniferous geology of Utah
Devonian southern paleotropical deposits
Carboniferous southern paleotropical deposits